Mary Tonkin is an Australian artist, who in 2002 won the Dobell Prize, the highest prize for drawing in Australia. She was awarded her prize for her work Rocky Outcrop, Werribee Gorge 2000.

Tonkin was born in Melbourne, Australia in 1973. In 1992, she was accepted to study at the Faculty of Art and Design at Monash University. She went on to obtain a Bachelor of Arts (Fine Arts) with honours and a Masters in Fine Arts.

From 1996-2004, she was a lecturer at Monash University.

Major recent exhibitions of Tonkin's works include Near the top dam (2007) and a retrospective exhibition Home 2000-2010 (2011-2) at the Burrinja Gallery in Upwey, Victoria.

References

1973 births
Living people
Monash University alumni
Academic staff of Monash University
Australian women artists